Quazi Nawshaba Ahmed is a Bangladeshi TV and film actress and voice artist.

Career
She first acted on film Udhao in 2008 and which was released on 2013. She also acted on film Chuye dile mon(2015) as Special appearance and Prothiruddo which was not released due to fund crisis. She also acted on films Dhaka Dreams (2017), Dhaka attack (2017), Bhubhan Majhi (2017), Chandrabati Kotha (2017) these films are in post-production.

Filmography

Film

Music video appearance

Controversy 

Ahmed was arrested was on 4 August 2018 at 10:30 PM from Uttara by Rapid Action Battalion. She was accused of spreading false news over the 2018 Bangladesh road safety protests. On 5 August 2018, Rapid Action Battalion officials claimed she confessed to the allegations. On 21 August  Nawshaba got ad-interim bail from Dhaka court regarding her health condition. She placed 4 day remand before the court and granted for two day remand on 10 August for quizzing.

References

Further reading

External links 

Bangladeshi television actresses
Bangladeshi film actresses
Living people
Year of birth missing (living people)